Kalāt Claimed is a play by Bahram Beyzai, written in 1982.

Text 
The play was composed in 1982, with identifiable inspirations from Macbeth, and first published in Tehran early in 1984 by Damavand Publishing. Later it was published by Beyzai's exclusive publisher, Roshangaran. The same publisher printed Manucher Anvar's English translation in 2016.

Plot 
The story is of two generals in the Mongol conquest of Khwarezmia and their disputes over the accession of Kalat (or even more likely Kalat-e Naderi) and its ultimate conquest by the Alans.

In Other Languages 
There is one English translation by Manuchehr Anvar, with minor modifications by the playwright's permission:

Notes

References 
 بیضایی، بهرام. «سالشمار زندگی و آثار بهرام بیضایی». مجلّه سیمیا زمستان ۱۳۸۶ شماره ۲

Plays by Bahram Beyzai
1983 plays
2016 books
Books about Iran
Iran in fiction
Persian-language books